Public holidays are observed in the Republic of North Macedonia for a number of reasons, including religious and national significance. They are generally accompanied by celebrations. The holidays are regulated by the 1998 Law on Holidays.

Besides these, there are several major religious & ethnic communities` holidays:

See also
 Public holidays in Yugoslavia

References

External links
 Public Holidays in 2016

 
North Macedonia
Holidays